Petar Kyumurdzhiev (born 15 December 1981 in Burgas) is a Bulgarian retired footballer who played as a defender.

References

External links
 
 

1981 births
Living people
Bulgarian footballers
Association football defenders
First Professional Football League (Bulgaria) players
FC Chernomorets Burgas players
PFC Slavia Sofia players
PFC Lokomotiv Plovdiv players
Akademik Sofia players
OFC Bdin Vidin players
Kerċem Ajax F.C. players
FC Sozopol players
Gozo Football League First Division players
Bulgarian expatriates in Malta